Essential dermatitis is an idiopathic inflammation of the skin that does not fit the picture of other well defined conditions (such as atopic or contact dermatitis) and is a diagnosis of exclusion.

See also 
 Dermatitis
 List of cutaneous conditions

References 

Dermatitis